Harburg may refer to:

Places in Germany
 Harburg (district), Lower Saxony
 Harburg, Bavaria
 Harburg, Hamburg, a borough of Hamburg
 Harburg (quarter), the former Hanoveran city of Harburg upon Elbe, now a quarter of Hamburg 
 Harburg-Wilhelmsburg, a Hanoveran city (1927–1937), now two quarters of Hamburg

Other uses
 Harburg (electoral district), Lower Saxony, Germany
 Harburg Castle, Bavaria, Germany
 Yip Harburg (1896–1981), American lyricist

See also